Roslyn Heights is a hamlet and census-designated place (CDP) in the Town of North Hempstead in Nassau County, on Long Island, in New York, United States. It is considered part of the Greater Roslyn area, which is anchored by the Incorporated Village of Roslyn. The population was 6,577 at the 2010 census.

History 
Roslyn Heights saw a major economic boom in the 1860s shortly after the Long Island Rail Road's Oyster Bay Branch was built through and opened in the area.

Starting in 1892, corporation was started to develop the northwestern section of the hamlet. Members of this development corporation included lawyers, bankers, and developers. This development, which was named Roslyn Highlands, was largely unsuccessful. Eventually, the western portion of the proposed Roslyn Highlands development was developed using the name of Roslyn Highlands while the eastern part was developed using the name of Roslyn Heights. These names were used for the respective sections until the whole area became known as Roslyn Heights in the late 1920s.

On July 18, 1913, the Roslyn Heights Post Office opened. It moved to its present location at 66 Mineola Avenue in 1967, with the dedication ceremony taking place on Sunday, July 30, 1967.

In the 1950s and 1960s, the area of Roslyn Heights south of the Northern State Parkway known as Roslyn Country Club proposed incorporating itself as a village, citing the desire for home rule the first time in the 1950s and their dissatisfaction with Nassau County's plans to widen Roslyn Road the second time in the 1960s. These proposals were ultimately unsuccessful, and all of Roslyn Heights remains an unincorporated hamlet within and directly governed by the Town of North Hempstead to this day.

A major urban renewal project also took place in the northeastern part of the hamlet during the 20th Century – specifically the area around the Roslyn Long Island Rail Road station known as Roslyn Plaza. The Roslyn Plaza Urban Renewal Project began in the early 1970s and the final phase broke ground in 1983. This project was carried out by the Town of North Hempstead.

The "Roslyn" part of its name is shared with Roslyn, Roslyn Estates, and Roslyn Harbor, and ultimately can be traced back to when the name "Roslyn" was chosen for that village, which was chosen because the geography in Roslyn reminded officials of the geography of Roslin, Scotland. The "Heights" part of its name reflects the name of the portion of the area developed using the name Roslyn Heights, which is ultimately the name which the Roslyn Heights Post Office opted to use when it was established in 1913.

Historically, like many other parts of the Greater Roslyn area, what is now known as Roslyn Heights was known as Hempstead Harbor until that name was changed to Roslyn in the 1840s.

Geography

Roslyn Roslyn Heights is split between three minor drainage areas: Inner Hempstead Harbor (part of the Hempstead Harbor Watershed), Hempstead Lake, and Mill River (the latter two being part of the Mill River Watershed), and is located within the larger Long Island Sound/Atlantic Ocean Watershed.

Demographics 

At the 2000 census there were 6,295 people, 2,168 households, and 1,773 families in the CDP. The population density was 4,223.6 per square mile (1,631.2/km). There were 2,226 housing units at an average density of 1,493.5/sq mi (576.8/km). The racial makeup of the CDP was 79.03% White, 6.45% African American, 0.11% Native American, 10.01% Asian, 2.00% from other races, and 2.40% from two or more races. Hispanic or Latino of any race were 6.45%.

Of the 2,168 households 39.1% had children under the age of 18 living with them, 65.8% were married couples living together, 12.5% had a female householder with no husband present, and 18.2% were non-families. 15.6% of households were one person and 8.9% were one person aged 65 or older. The average household size was 2.89 and the average family size was 3.21.

The age distribution was 26.7% under the age of 18, 5.8% from 18 to 24, 25.8% from 25 to 44, 25.7% from 45 to 64, and 15.9% 65 or older. The median age was 40 years. For every 100 females, there were 93.6 males. For every 100 females age 18 and over, there were 90.6 males.

The median household income was $84,705 and the median family income  was $100,474. Males had a median income of $76,812 versus $38,343 for females. The per capita income for the village was $40,132. About 4.5% of families and 5.7% of the population were below the poverty line, including 8.4% of those under age 18 and 2.7% of those age 65 or over

Parks and recreation 

 Clark Botanic Garden
 Donald Street Park
 East Park
Gayle Community Center
North Park
Shepherd Lane Playground
 Wheatley Hills Golf Club

Government

Town representation 
As Roslyn Heights is an unincorporated part of the Town of North Hempstead, it is directly governed by the town's government in Manhasset.

As of March 2022, Roslyn Heights is represented on the Town Board by Peter J. Zuckerman, and is located in its 2nd Council District.

Representation in higher government

Nassau County representation 
Roslyn Heights is located primarily within Nassau County's 16th Legislative district, which as of March 2022 is represented in the Nassau County Legislature by Arnold Drucker (D–Plainview). However, part of the northwestern portion of the hamlet is located within Nassau County's 9th Legislative district, which as of March 2022 is represented in the Nassau County Legislature by Richard Nicoello (R–New Hyde Park).

New York State representation

New York State Assembly 
Roslyn Heights is split between the New York State Assembly's 16th and 19th Assembly districts, which as of March 2022 are represented by Gina Sillitti (D–Manorhaven) and Edward Ra (R–Garden City South), respectively.

New York State Senate 
Roslyn Heights is located in the New York State Senate's 7th State Senate district, which as of March 2022 is represented in the New York State Senate by Anna Kaplan (D–North Hills).

Federal representation

United States Congress 
Roslyn Heights is located in New York's 3rd congressional district, which as of March 2022 is represented in the United States Congress by Tom Suozzi (D–Glen Cove).

United States Senate 
Like the rest of New York, Roslyn Heights is represented in the United States Senate by Charles Schumer (D) and Kirsten Gillibrand (D).

Politics 
In the 2016 U.S. presidential election, the majority of Roslyn Heights voters voted for Hillary Clinton (D).

Education

School districts 

Most of Roslyn Heights is located within the boundaries of (and is thus served by) the Roslyn Union Free School District. However, smaller portions of the hamlet are located within the East Williston Union Free School District, Herricks Union Free School District and the Mineola School District. As such, children who reside within Roslyn Heights and attend public schools will go to school in one of these three districts depending on where they live within the hamlet.

Library districts 
Roslyn Heights is split between Roslyn's library district (which is served by the Bryant Library) and the Shelter Rock Library District. The Bryant Library serves the areas of the hamlet within the Roslyn Union Free School District, and the Shelter Rock Library District serves the areas of the hamlet within the boundaries of the East Williston and Herricks Union Free School Districts.

Infrastructure

Transportation

Road 
Two limited-access highways run through and serve Roslyn Heights:

 The Long Island Expressway (I-495) (exit 37)
 The Northern State Parkway (exits 28, 29, & 30)
Other major roads which pass through the hamlet include Lincoln Avenue, Mineola/Willis Avenue, I.U. Willets Road, Roslyn Road, and Warner Avenue. Furthermore, the hamlet's southernmost border touches New York State Route 25B.

Rail 
Roslyn Heights is served by the Oyster Bay Branch of the Long Island Rail Road. Two stations are located either within or on the border of Roslyn Heights:

 Roslyn (located in the heart of the hamlet, just south of Lincoln Avenue)
 Albertson (located on the border between the hamlets of Albertson and Roslyn Heights, just north of I.U. Willets Road)

Bus 
As of October 2021, Roslyn Heights is served by two Nassau Inter-County Express (NICE) bus routes:

 The n23 (Mineola-Manorhaven)
 The n27 (Hempstead-Glen Cove)

Utilities

Natural gas 
National Grid USA provides natural gas to homes and businesses that are hooked up to natural gas lines in Roslyn Heights.

Power 
PSEG Long Island provides power to all homes and businesses within Roslyn Heights.

Sewage 
Roslyn Heights is partially sewered. The southern part of Roslyn Heights is within the Nassau County Sewage District. Another, smaller sewer district exists within Roslyn Heights in the Roslyn Plaza area, which flows into the rest of Nassau County's sewer system via the East Hills Interceptor line.

The remainder of Roslyn Heights relies on cesspools and septic systems.

Water 
The portion of Roslyn Heights north of the Northern State Parkway is located within the boundaries of (and is thus served by) the Roslyn Water District, the area of Roslyn Heights between the Northern State Parkway and the Wheatley Hills Golf Club is located within the boundaries of (and is thus served by) the Albertson Water District, and the portion of the Wheatley Hills Golf Club within Roslyn Heights is located within the boundaries of (and is thus served by) the Village of East Williston's water system.

Notable people
Gary Ackerman – Former Democratic Congressman for the 5th District of New York State.
Eric Asimov – Dining reporter for The New York Times.
Emile Zola Berman – Litigator whose defense roster included Sirhan Sirhan.
John Giorno – Artist and poet.
Shep Messing – Olympic soccer goalkeeper and current broadcaster.
Chris Miller – Author and co-writer, Animal House.
Darren Rovell (born 1978) – Sports business analyst.
Van Toffler – President of MTV.
Harry Wachtel (1917–1997) – Lawyer and businessman.
Fred Wilpon – Owner of the New York Mets.
Mike Pollock (born 1965) – Voice actor.
Jeff Wilpon – Chief Operating Officer of the New York Mets.
Richard Zimler – Novelist.

See also 

 Village of Roslyn
 Town of North Hempstead

References

External links 

 Roslyn Chamber of Commerce official website
Town of North Hempstead official website

Town of North Hempstead, New York
Census-designated places in New York (state)
Hamlets in New York (state)
Census-designated places in Nassau County, New York
Hamlets in Nassau County, New York